South Yuyanq’ Ch’ex (formerly "South Suicide Peak") is a  mountain in the U.S. state of Alaska, located in Chugach State Park. The peak is notable for its graceful pyramidal shape and symmetry with nearby North Yuyanq’ Ch’ex, and as the tallest mountain rising from the North side of Cook Inlet's Turnagain Arm.

Location 
South Yuyanq’ Ch’ex is located on the southern edge of Chugach State Park, in Alaska, and is positioned between North Yuyanq’ Ch’ex, Indianhouse Mountain, Rabbit Lake, and McHugh Peak.

Outdoor Recreation and Climbing Routes
Due to its location near Anchorage, Alaska and ease of access from multiple trailheads, South Yuyanq’ Ch’ex is a relatively popular climbing destination. It is considered a non-technical, but rigorous, one-day climb when free of snow.

South Yuyanq’ Ch’ex is most often climbed via the following routes:
 Via Hauser's gully on the northern face, which ascends steeply from the moraines between North and South Yuyanq’ Ch’ex, adjacent to Rabbit Lake
 Via the Windy Gap pass between North Yuyanq’ Ch’ex and South Yuyanq’ Ch’ex
 From the South side and ridge via the Falls Creek trailhead
 Via the western ridge, accessed either from Rainbow Peak or from the upper McHugh Creek trail.

References

External links
 Summit Post's page on South Suicide Peak, which includes more detailed information about routes and terrain

Mountains of Alaska
Mountains of Anchorage, Alaska